Michael Malcolm (born 1985) is an English footballer.

Michael Malcolm may also refer to:

Baronets
Sir Michael Malcolm, 3rd Baronet (died 1793), of the Malcolm baronets
Sir Michael Malcolm, 6th Baronet (died 1828), of the Malcolm baronets
Sir Michael Albert James Malcolm, 10th Baronet (1898–1976), of the Malcolm baronets

Others
Michael Malcolm, British actor in the Doctor Who story Frontios
Mike Malcolm, founder of NetApp and Blue Coat Systems

See also
Malcolm Michael, Australian rules footballer